Laura Chapman Hruska (October 14, 1935 – January 9, 2010) was an American lawyer, novelist, and co-founder and editor in chief of the Soho Press.

Life 
Laura Mae Chapman was born in The Bronx, and was raised in Manhattan. After graduating from Cornell University, she attended Yale Law School. After a short career as an attorney, she quit to start a family and focus on writing. She published three novels (as Laura Chapman). In 1986, she, her husband, Alan Hruska, and their friend, Juris Jurjevics, the former editor in chief of the Dial Press, founded Soho Press with the objective of publishing serious literature by authors who had yet to be discovered. The publishing house is unusual in accepting—and actually reading—unsolicited works.

One of Soho Press's notable discoveries was Breath, Eyes, Memory by the then-unknown Haitian-born author Edwidge Danticat. In 1994, the company started the Soho Crime imprint dedicated to mysteries with foreign settings. In 2008, it forged a partnership with Constable & Robinson to publish British crime fiction in the United States.

Hruska died on January 9, 2010, of cancer, aged 74, in Manhattan. She was survived by her husband, three children, six grandchildren and her sister.

References

1935 births
2010 deaths
20th-century American novelists
American publishers (people)
Deaths from cancer in New York (state)
Cornell University alumni
People from the Bronx
Writers from Manhattan
Yale Law School alumni
20th-century American women lawyers
American women novelists
20th-century American women writers
Novelists from New York (state)
20th-century American lawyers
21st-century American women